José Vicente García Acosta (born 4 August 1972 in San Sebastián) is a former Spanish professional road bicycle racer. In his career, he won a stage of the Tour de France, two stages in the Vuelta a España and the Grand Prix Eddy Merckx with Abraham Olano. He completed the Vuelta 14 times.

García Acosta retired after the 2011 season, having spent 17 years in the pro ranks with the same team, albeit racing under different sponsorship names. After filling several different staff duties during the Giro d'Italia and the Vuelta a España in 2012, Garcia Acosta was named Directeur Sportif ("Director Deportivo") of Movistar beginning in the 2013 season.

Major results
Sources:

1996
 1st Overall Vuelta Ciclista a Navarra
1st Stage 6
1997
 1st Stage 14 Vuelta a España
 7th Overall Ronde van Nederland
1998
 1st GP Eddy Merckx (with Abraham Olano)
 4th Overall Volta ao Alentejo
 5th Overall Circuit Sarthe
 10th Subida al Naranco
1999
 6th LuK Challenge Chrono
 7th Overall Volta ao Algarve
2000
 1st Stage 13 Tour de France
2002
 1st Stage 19 Vuelta a España
 7th Overall Tour of Luxembourg
2003
 1st Stage 2 Vuelta a Burgos
 1st Stage 2 TTT Vuelta a Castilla y León
 8th GP Pino Cerami
2004
 1st Stage 2 TTT Vuelta a Castilla y León
 7th Clásica de Almería
2006
 1st Stages 3 Vuelta a Castilla y León
2007
 1st Stage 1 TTT Tour Méditerranéen
2011
 1st Stage 3 TTT Vuelta a Burgos

Grand Tour general classification results timeline

References

External links 
 
 

1972 births
Living people
Spanish male cyclists
Spanish Vuelta a España stage winners
Spanish Tour de France stage winners
Sportspeople from San Sebastián
Movistar Team (men's team)
Cyclists from the Basque Country (autonomous community)